The 1984 Wichita State Shockers football team was an American football team that represented  Wichita State as a member of the Missouri Valley Conference during the 1984 NCAA Division I-A football season. In their first year under head coach Ron Chismar, the team compiled a 2–9 record.

Schedule

Notes

References

Wichita State
Wichita State Shockers football seasons
Wichita State Shockers football